Graeme Murray Crossman (born 30 November 1945) is a former New Zealand rugby union player. A hooker, Crossman represented Bay of Plenty at a provincial level, and was a member of the New Zealand national side, the All Blacks, from 1974 to 1976. He played 19 matches for the All Blacks, captaining the side in five games, but he did not gain any test caps. He later coached Bay of Plenty between 1979 and 1984.

References

1945 births
Living people
Rugby union players from New Plymouth
People educated at Tamaki College
New Zealand rugby union players
New Zealand international rugby union players
Bay of Plenty rugby union players
Rugby union hookers
New Zealand rugby union coaches